The women's national under-17 basketball team of the Philippines represents the country in junior women's under-16 and under-17 FIBA tournaments.

Competitions

FIBA U16 Women's Asian Championship

Current roster
Philippines roster at the 2022 FIBA U16 Women's Asian Championship:

|}
| valign="top" |
 Head coach

 Assistant coaches

Legend
(C) Team captain
from field describes lastclub before the tournament
|}

Latest Scores

2022 FIBA U16 Women's Asian Championship

Past rosters

2009 FIBA Asia Under-16 Championship for Women: finished 7th among 12 teams

Likhang Hinirang Javier, Trisha Angela Dy, Tara Shane Araneta, Elrica Aniela Castro, Jacqueline Tanaman, Lore Rivera, Trisha Anne Piatos, Regina Marie Pioquinto, Maria Rosario Franchesca Tantoco, Danica Therese Jose, Alyanna Francesca Nitorreda, Jonah Marie Melendres

References

External links
Samahang Basketbol ng Pilipinas Official Website

under
Women's national under-17 basketball teams